Alexander Geoffrey Milton (born 19 May 1996) is an English cricketer. He made his first-class debut on 4 April 2016 for Cardiff MCCU against Hampshire as part of the Marylebone Cricket Club University fixtures.

In September 2017, Milton signed his first professional contract with Worcestershire County Cricket Club ahead of the 2018 season. In October 2018, Milton signed a three-year extension on his professional contract, confirming he will be staying at Worcestershire until 2021.

He made his List A debut for Worcestershire against the West Indies A in a tri-series warm-up match on 19 June 2018.

References

External links
 

1996 births
Living people
People from Redhill, Surrey
People educated at Malvern College
English cricketers
Cardiff MCCU cricketers
Worcestershire cricketers